Wolber–Spidel was a French professional cycling team that existed from 1981 to 1984. It was a successor of the  team of 1980. Notable victories include the 1982 Milan–San Remo with Marc Gomez and the 1984 Critérium du Dauphiné with Martín Ramírez.

References

Cycling teams based in France
Defunct cycling teams based in France
1981 establishments in France
1984 disestablishments in France
Cycling teams established in 1981
Cycling teams disestablished in 1984